Ćao, zdravo (English: Bye, Hello) is the debut single by Serbian recording artist Nikolija. It was released on 9 April 2013 under IDJTunes. "Ćao,zdravo" features guest vocals from rapper Teror Teča, who also wrote the lyrics. The music and production was handled by Marko Peruničić and Nebojša Arežina from Atelje Trag. "Ćao, zdravo" is also featured on Nikolija's debut album №1 (2016).

Background
After graduating from college in Athens, Greece in 2013, Nikolija moved back to Belgrade. There, her friend and singer Milan Stanković introduced her to Marko Peruničić and Nebojša Arežina from Atelje Trag, who would become her frequent collaborators. According to Nikolija, "Ćao, zdravo" draws inspiration from the 2012 Wisin & Yandel's single "Follow the Leader" featuring Jennifer Lopez.

The song was released alongside a music video, which was directed by Andrej Ilić and produced by Đorđe Trbović and Boris Zec from IDJVideos. It features S&M aesthetics, because of which the song initially received polarizing public reception. The music video also received comparison to the later released "Work bitch" by Britney Spears. In an interview with a Serbian Britney Spears fan forum, Britney.rs, Nikolija stated:

Credits and personnel
Credits adapted from the liner notes of №1.
 Nikolija - vocals
 S. Pešić (aka Teror Techa) - lyrics
 Atelje Trag - music and arrangement
 Ivana Peters - backing vocals

Release history

References 

Serbian songs
2013 singles
House music songs
2013 songs